The Lab were an Australian Sydney-based electronic music band consisting of keyboardist Paul Mac, vocalist Yolanda Podolski and vocalist and bassist Warwick Factor. The band was started by Paul Mac and Tristan Mason and an early lineup included two bass players. The name came about when one of them was listening to an Eric B and Rakim album which had the vocal line in it: "Back to the lab" which, according to Mason: "described our after gig practices, as in lets go back to The Lab, which was where me, Paul and Yolanda all lived." They formed in the late 1980s and initially recorded on the rooArt label. Their first release was the track "Heaven" which was included on rooArt's 1990 Young Blood 3 new artists sampler.

The Lab's early work was characterised by a dense, darkwave-industrial sensibility mixed with techno and synthpop elements with vocals provided by Factor and the operatically-trained Podolski. Their early sound displayed influences as varied as Cocteau Twins to Tackhead (whom they supported at a 1989 Sydney show) and New Order. Their sound was also influenced by the classical training of Mac and the operatically trained alto singer Podolski. 
Tom Ellard from Severed Heads helped produce an album during this era that was never released, and only a smattering of the darker material made its way on to the Ultra and Terminal EPs released in 1992 and 1993, respectively.

The Lab's live performances, mostly at Sydney inner-city venues, were noteworthy for their use of multimedia, beyond any other small live bands of the time. Live performances made use of multiple film and/or video projectors, displaying surreal footage and stills synchronised with each part of each song they were playing .
While The Lab enjoyed good airplay rotation on the youth radio station Triple J, they never achieved high-level commercial success.

The Lab took a recording hiatus during the mid-1990s as Paul Mac found moderate pop success with his other, more commercially oriented project, Itch-E and Scratch-E. Two singles "Beautiful Sadness" (1996) and "I Will Find You" (1997) were released in advance  of the debut album proper, 1997's Labyrinth. By this time their sound had evolved into a more ambient-pop-oriented direction, but the singles had little chart impact. Labyrinth turned out to also be their last album and the group disbanded in the late 1990s as the members pursued solo projects.

Discography 
Albums
 Ultra (EP), rooArt (1992)
 Terminal (EP), rooArt (1993)
 Labyrinth, BMG (1997) (included a bonus disc Ultra-Terminal which included the first two EPs, with the exception of the last hidden track on the original Terminal EP)
Singles
 "Heaven" (1990) (only released on Young Blood 3 compilation, a completely different remix/version appeared on Ultra EP)
 "Beautiful Sadness", Ra Records (1996)
 "I Will Find You" (1997)

References

External links

Australian electronic musicians
Musical groups from Sydney